Mirko Barbagli (born December 29, 1982) is an Italian football defender who currently plays for UC Sinalunghese.

Career
Since his debut in 2002, Barbagli has obtained 57 caps in Serie B with Arezzo and 6 with Grosseto.

References

External links

Living people
Serie B players
Association football defenders
1982 births
Italian footballers
Sportspeople from Arezzo
S.S. Arezzo players
F.C. Grosseto S.S.D. players
A.C. Perugia Calcio players
Aurora Pro Patria 1919 players
U.S. Alessandria Calcio 1912 players
A.S.D. Città di Foligno 1928 players
Footballers from Tuscany